The Copa CONMEBOL was an annual association football tournament established in 1992. The competition was organized by the South American Football Confederation, or CONMEBOL, and it was usually contested by 16 clubs from its member associations. The tournament ended in 1999, following the expansion of Copa Libertadores to 32 teams. The Copa Mercosur and Copa Merconorte, which both started in 1998, replaced the Copa CONMEBOL, and the merger of those 3 cups transformed in the current Copa Sudamericana.

The finals are contested over two legs, one at each participating club's stadium. Atlético Mineiro won the inaugural competition in 1992, defeating Olimpia. Seven clubs have won the competition since its inception. Atlético Mineiro holds the record for the most victories, winning the competition two times. Teams from Brazil have won the competition the most, with five wins among them.

Key

Finals

Performances

By club

By city

By country

Clubs

By semifinal appearances

By nation

Number of participating clubs by nation

References

External links
 Copa CONMEBOL on RSSSF

finals
Copa CONMEBOL